Forte de São José (Portuguese for the Fort of Saint Joseph) is a fort located in the city of Porto Inglês in the southern part of Maio Island, Cape Verde. It was built by the Portuguese around 1743, in order to protect the town of Porto Inglês from pirate attacks. Today, the fort is one of the tourist attractions of the town.

Forte de São José Lighthouse (Farol de Forte de São José)
A lighthouse was built in the fort in 1887. It is a stone tower painted white. The light is solar powered. It is 18 meters tall, sits at 4 meters above sea level and its focal height is 22 meters, its range is 17 km (9 nautical miles). Its characteristic is Fl (3) R 12s.

See also
List of lighthouses in Cape Verde
Portuguese Empire

References

Maio, Cape Verde
Forts in Cape Verde
Lighthouses in Cape Verde
Portuguese colonial architecture in Cape Verde